Autogestion may refer to:

 Workers' self-management
  The construction of a self-managed economy